The Massachusetts general election, 2014 was held on November 4, 2014, throughout Massachusetts. Primary elections took place on September 9, 2014.

Governor and Lieutenant Governor

Incumbent Democratic Governor Deval Patrick did not seek re-election to a third term in office. The office of Lieutenant Governor had been vacant since the resignation of Tim Murray on June 2, 2013.

Primary elections for Governor and Lieutenant Governor were conducted separately on September 9, 2014, with the Democrats nominating Massachusetts Attorney General Martha Coakley and former CEO of the Democratic National Convention Steve Kerrigan, and the Republicans nominating former state cabinet secretary and 2010 gubernatorial nominee Charlie Baker and former State Representative Karyn Polito. Three Independent candidates also ran: healthcare executive Evan Falchuk and his running mate Angus Jennings; evangelical pastor Scott Lively and his running mate Shelly Saunders; and businessman Jeff McCormick and his running mate Tracy Post.

Secretary of the Commonwealth
Incumbent Democratic Secretary of the Commonwealth William F. Galvin ran for re-election to a sixth term in office. Malden City Councilor At-Large David D'Arcangelo ran as a Republican and Acton attorney Danny Factor ran as a candidate with the Green-Rainbow Party.

General election

Polling

Attorney General
Incumbent Democratic Attorney General Martha Coakley was eligible to run for re-election to a third term in office, but she instead ran for Governor.

Democratic primary

Candidates
Former State Senator Warren Tolman and former Assistant Attorney General Maura Healey ran for the Democratic nomination.

State Representative Harold Naughton Jr. was a Democratic candidate, but dropped out of the race to run for re-election to the House instead.

Polling

Results

Bold denotes candidate met the minimum threshold of 15 percent to appear on the primary ballot

Republican primary
Attorney John Miller was the only Republican to file to run for the office.

General election

Polling

Treasurer and Receiver-General
Incumbent Democratic Treasurer and Receiver-General Steve Grossman was eligible to run for re-election to a second term in office, but he instead ran unsuccessfully for the Democratic nomination for Governor.

Democratic primary

Candidates
State Representative Tom Conroy, State Senator Barry Finegold and former member of the Brookline Board of Selectmen Deb Goldberg were the Democratic candidates.

Polling

Results

Bold denotes candidate met the minimum threshold of 15 percent to appear on the primary ballot

Republican primary
Businessman Mike Heffernan was the only Republican to file to run.

Green-Rainbow nomination
Ian T. Jackson ran as a Green-Rainbow candidate.

General election

Polling

Auditor 
Incumbent Democratic Auditor Suzanne M. Bump ran for re-election to a second term in office. Patricia Saint Aubin was the Republican challenger and M.K. Merelice ran as a candidate with the Green-Rainbow Party.

General election

Polling

United States Senate 
 The Massachusetts seat in the United States Senate won by Ed Markey in the 2013 special election was up for election in 2014. Markey was re-elected with 62% of the vote.

United States House of Representatives

All of Massachusetts' nine seats in the United States House of Representatives were up for election in 2014.

Massachusetts Senate

All 40 seats in the Massachusetts Senate were up for election in 2014.

Massachusetts House of Representatives

All 160 seats in the Massachusetts House of Representatives were up for election in 2014.

County
Counties in Massachusetts elected county commissioners, district attorneys, registers of probate and sheriffs.

Ballot measures
There were four state-wide ballot questions, all initiatives.

References

External links
 directory of Massachusetts candidates list of website links
 
Election Results – Nov. 4, 2014.  WBZ

 
Massachusetts